Afghanistan has an embassy in Oslo. Norway has an embassy in Kabul.

There are 10,475 Afghan people living in Norway. The Ministry of Foreign Affairs discourage people to travel to Afghanistan. Norway participated in the International Security Assistance Force and in the Resolute Support Mission in the War in Afghanistan.

See also
 Foreign relations of Afghanistan
 Foreign relations of Norway

References

 
Norway
Bilateral relations of Norway